Dennis Löfqvist (born 1 January 1967) is a former speedway rider from Sweden.

Speedway career 
Löfqvist rode in the top tier of British Speedway from 1989 until 1992, riding for King's Lynn Stars.

He stood as reserve for the final of the Speedway World Championship in the 1990 Individual Speedway World Championship following a successful qualification through the Nordic final and his high placing in the Intercontinental Final.

References 

1967 births
Living people
Swedish speedway riders
King's Lynn Stars riders
Sportspeople from Gotland County